Richard Eustaquio Mascarañas Granada (born 14 September 1979 in Tacuarembó) is a Uruguayan cyclist, who currently rides for Uruguayan amateur team CC Cerro Largo.

Major results

2003
 1st Stage 4 Rutas de América
 8th Overall Vuelta del Uruguay
2004
 4th Overall Vuelta del Uruguay
1st Stage 4
2006
 1st Stage 5 Vuelta del Uruguay
2007
 3rd Overall Rutas de América
1st Stage 2
 3rd Overall Vuelta del Uruguay
1st Stage 3
2008
 1st  Road race, Pan American Road Championships
 1st Overall Vuelta del Uruguay
1st Stage 8
2009
 1st Stage 1 Rutas de América
 National Road Championships
2nd Road race
3rd Time trial
 3rd Overall Vuelta del Uruguay
1st Stage 9
 7th Copa América de Ciclismo
2010
 1st Overall Vuelta del Uruguay
1st Stages 1 & 2
 3rd Time trial, National Road Championships
 3rd Overall Rutas de América
1st Stage 3
2011
 4th Overall Rutas de América
2012
 2nd Time trial, National Road Championships
 9th Overall Rutas de América
2013
 1st Stage 2 Vuelta del Uruguay
2014
 1st Stage 2b (TTT) Vuelta del Uruguay
2015
 1st Stage 2 Rutas de América
 8th Overall Vuelta del Uruguay
2016
 1st Stage 4 Volta Ciclística Internacional do Rio Grande do Sul
 National Road Championships
3rd Road race
3rd Time trial
 3rd Overall Vuelta del Uruguay
1st Stages 2 & 3a (TTT)
2017
 1st  Road race, National Road Championships
 8th Overall Vuelta del Uruguay
2018
 7th Overall Vuelta del Uruguay
2019
 2nd Road race, National Road Championships
 9th Overall Vuelta del Uruguay

References

External links

1979 births
Living people
Uruguayan male cyclists